The Private Terms Stakes is a race for Thoroughbred horses held in late March at Laurel Park in Maryland, USA. The ungraded stakes race is open to three-year-olds, is run over one mile and an eighth on the dirt, and offers a purse of $150,000. It is a minor race on the road to the Triple Crown each spring. The winner of the Private Terms Stakes typically races next in either the Federico Tesio Stakes (Preakness Trial) at Pimlico Race Course in Baltimore or the Wood Memorial Stakes at Aqueduct Racetrack in New York.

This race is named for Private Terms (born 1985), who won 13 of his 17 starts, including the Grade I Wood Memorial Stakes, the Grade II Gotham Stakes, the grade two Massachusetts Handicap, the grade two General George Handicap and the grade three Federico Tesio Stakes. He had career earnings of $1,243,947 and nine stakes victories. In his retirement, Private Terms has had great success, siring millionaires stakes winners Soul of the Matter and Afternoon Deelites. He has an outstanding success rate as a sire, having 73% of his progeny win races and 11% of his progeny becoming graded stakes winners.

Records 
Speed record: 
 1 mile - 1:37.18 - Plantation (2010)
  miles - 1:43 4/5 - Haymaker (1991)
  miles - 1:49.00 - Dr. Best (1997)

Most wins by an owner:
 2- Robert Meyerhoff (DBA Fitzugh LLC in '07) (1994 &2007)

Most wins by a jockey:
 2 - Ramon Dominguez   (2001 & 2004)
 2 - Steve Hamilton   (1997 & 2005)

Most wins by a trainer:
 2 - King T. Leatherbury    (1992 & 2005)
 2 - Richard W. Small    (1994 & 2007)

Winners of the Private Terms Stakes

See also 
 Private Terms Stakes "top three finishers" and starters
 Laurel Park Racecourse

References

External links
Laurel Park racetrack

1990 establishments in Maryland
Triple Crown Prep Races
Laurel Park Racecourse
Horse races in Maryland
Recurring sporting events established in 1990